Pyrrolidine, also known as tetrahydropyrrole, is an organic compound with the molecular formula (CH2)4NH.  It is a cyclic secondary amine, also classified as a saturated heterocycle.  It is a colourless liquid that is miscible with water and most organic solvents. It has a characteristic odor that has been described as "ammoniacal, fishy, shellfish-like". In addition to pyrrolidine itself, many substituted pyrrolidines are known.

Production and synthesis

Industrial production
Pyrrolidine is prepared industrially by the reaction of 1,4-butanediol and ammonia at a temperature of 165–200 °C and a pressure of 17–21 MPa in the presence of a cobalt- and nickel oxide catalyst, which is supported on alumina.

The reaction is carried out in the liquid phase in a continuous tube- or tube bundle reactor, which is operated in the cycle gas method. The catalyst is arranged as a fixed-bed and the conversion is carried out in the downflow mode. The product is obtained after multistage purification and separation by extractive and azeotropic distillation.

Laboratory synthesis
In the laboratory, pyrrolidine was usually synthesised by treating 4-chlorobutan-1-amine with a strong base:

Furthermore, 5-membered N-heterocyclic ring of the pyrrolidine derivatives can be synthesized via cascade reactions.

Occurrence
Many modifications of pyrrolidine are found in natural and synthetic drugs and drug candidates. The pyrrolidine ring structure is present in numerous natural alkaloids i.a. nicotine and hygrine. It is found in many drugs such as procyclidine and bepridil. It also forms the basis for the racetam compounds (e.g. piracetam, aniracetam). The amino acids proline and hydroxyproline are, in a structural sense, derivatives of pyrrolidine.

Reactions
Pyrrolidine is a base. Its basicity is typical of other dialkyl amines. Relative to many secondary amines, pyrrolidine is distinctive because of its compactness, a consequence of its cyclic structure.

Pyrrolidine is used as a building block in the synthesis of more complex organic compounds. It is used to activate ketones and aldehydes toward nucleophilic addition by formation of enamines (e.g. used in the Stork enamine alkylation):

References

External links

 
Amine solvents